List of unincorporated communities in Louisiana is the list of populated places.

A
Albany
Anacoco
Angie
Ashland, Concordia Parish
Athens
Atlanta

B
Baskin
Belcher
Bethany
Bienville
Bonita
Bryceland
Bueche

C
Calvin
Cankton
Castor
Chamberlin
Chataignier
Choudrant
Clarence
Clarks
Collinston
Converse
Creola

D
Delta
Devalls
Dixie Inn
Dodson
Downsville
Doyline
Dry Prong
Dubberly

E
East Hodge
Edgefield
Epps
Estherwood
Evangeline
Evans
Elizabeth

F
Fenton
Fisher
Flora
Florence
Florien
Folsom
Forest
Forest Hill
French Settlement

G
Georgetown
Gilbert
Gilliam
Goldonna
Grand Cane
Grayson
Grosse Tete

H
Hall Summit
Harrisonburg
Heflin
Hessmer
Hodge
Hosston

I
Ida
Ithra

J
Jamestown
Junction City

K
Kahns
Kilbourne

L
Lillie
Lisbon
Lobdell
Longstreet
Loreauville
Lucky
Lukeville

M
Martin
Maurice
McNary
Mer Rouge
Mermentau
Montpelier
Moreauville
Morganza
Morse
Mound

N
Napoleonville
Natchez
Noble
North Hodge
North Rodessa
Norwood

O
Oak Ridge

P
Palmetto
Parks
Pine Prairie
Pioneer
Plaucheville
Pleasant Hill, Bienville Parish
Pleasant Hill, Lincoln Parish
Pleasant Hill, Natchitoches Parish
Port Vincent
Powhatan
Provencal

Q
Quitman

R
Reeves
Richmond

S
Saline
Shongaloo
Sicily Island
Sikes
Simpson
Simsboro
South Mansfield
Spearsville
Stanley
Sun

T
Tangipahoa
Tickfaw
Turkey Creek

V
Varnado

W
Wilson
Winterville

See also
List of cities, towns, and villages in Louisiana

Unincorporated communities

Louisiana